Eleanora Atherton (14 February 1782 – 12 September 1870) was an English philanthropist best known for her work in Manchester, England. At the time of her death, she was one of the richest British women in the nineteenth century.

Life

Atherton was born on 14 February 1782 and baptised in Manchester Cathedral on the 21 March 1782, the daughter of Henry Atherton (1740–1816), a Preston born  barrister of Lincoln's Inn, and Ann Byrom (1751–1826), the great-granddaughter of the poet, John Byrom. Her education is an unknown, although we know she grew up in an intellectual environment and did not live an ostentatious lifestyle or travel overseas. Atherton donated to many philanthropic organisations within the Manchester area, and beyond. Specifically those that aided the living conditions of the young and the sick, and the elderly, which was often channeled through entities that shared her Anglican faith. Atherton carried on her maternal family tradition of church building and restoration. 

Atherton resided half the year at the Byrom family home at 23 Quay Street in Manchester and half at the family's country home Kersal Cell in Salford. During her lifetime she was a well known figure in Manchester, simply by her distinct sedan chair and carriage.

Atherton inherited accumulated wealth from several family members, which included property in London, Cheshire, Lancashire, and Jamaica. The Caribbean estates were sugar plantations that had been bequeathed to both Atherton and her sister in 1823, following the death of her father in August 1816.  These profitable estates had been previously owned by her slave-owning uncle, William Atherton who died in 1803.

Between 1819 and 1830, Atherton lived at 12 Great James Street in Bloomsbury, a fashionable residential street, in proximity to numerous cultural, intellectual, and educational institutions.

Whilst the Preston Historical Society have a picture of Atherton as an elderly lady, she was portrayed  as “Madame Alice Arlington” in the fictional novel “Longleat”, a trilogy by Elleray Lake, the pseudonym of Mrs David Armstrong, a Lancashire author, and  published in 1870, the year of Atherton’s death. In this novel Madame Arlington, a diminutive wealthy old lady is described as “straight as an arrow”, attired from a bygone age, fully participating in a modern assembly, albeit as a ghost of past times.

In real life, Atherton was referred to as Madame Byrom; likely a name she promoted herself, in order to accentuate her maternal lineage of which she was so proud, and society courteously followed. Victorian biographers such as Josiah Rose mention her being “distinguished by honourable  wealth”, a “generous public spirit” and “wide reaching charity”.

Atherton died on 12 September 1870 in her home in Quay Street where she had been confined for three years. She was buried in St Paul's Church in Kersal, one of the churches which she had funded in 1851. She died one of the richest women in the nineteenth century having left £400,000.

Philanthropy
Atherton never married. Perhaps she never wanted to and was independently minded. However at the age of 34, she began to repeatedly inherit country estates and large investments; and it is likely that she would have initially questioned its origin, as well as the annual profits emanating from two sugar cane plantations and sought both legal and fiscal council. Consequently, with this financial independence and wealth, Atherton was able to embark of a series of philanthropic causes; a role she may have assumed out of moral duty, or because of her faith.

Her earlier prospects of find a suitor and eventual marriage may have been tainted by a judgmental social scene that would at the time  assumed that her wedded sister, Lucy would have a child and be the designed heir. However Lucy and her husband Richard Willis of Hallsnead Hall in Whiston died without offspring, making Atherton a very wealthy lady to do as she pleased.

During her lifetime, Atherton is estimated to have annually donated several thousands of pounds to charities, in and around Manchester every year. She is thought to have given away a total of around £100,000 between 1838 and 1870; enough to put her generosity on parity with Humphrey Chetham, who created institutions that she much admired. The charities funded by Atherton typically reflected her Anglican faith, education, children and the helping of the most vulnerable.

Atherton was perceived as highly respectable and generous. Her wealth from slavery had effectively been laundered once it went to charitable causes.

In 1841, Atherton donated £18,000 to build Holy Trinity Church in Hulme, Manchester, followed by  St Paul's Church on the edge of Kersal Moor, built in 1851. In 1860 she paid for the restoration of the Jesus Chapel in Manchester Cathedral, as well as later contributing to the restoration of the cathedral tower. Several other members of her family funded the building and restoration of various churches and Atherton later bequeathed £5,000 to St John's Church in Manchester which her grandfather, Edward Byrom funded. This church, which is no longer in existence was painted by J. M. W. Turner.

As well as religious buildings, she also donated funds to various medical buildings in Manchester including St Mary's Hospital, founded in 1790 and  Manchester Royal Eye Hospital founded in 1814, and many other institutions which helped people who were terminally ill.

Atherton funded several buildings in memory of family members including the new wing of a Manchester ragged school in memory of her aunt, Eleanora Byrom, and almshouses in Prescot in memory of her sister, Lucy who died in 1859.

In addition to funding medical and religious institutions, Atherton contributed greatly to the wellbeing of Manchester’s population and the growth of the city by selling land to enable the construction of the Liverpool and Manchester Railway which opened to passengers in 1830. During her lifetime Atherton’s charities  invested the railways, in 1867 holding 4% stock of the Lancashire and Yorkshire Railway.

Plantation owner and absentee slave-owner within British society

Atherton became a Caribbean plantation proprietor in 1823.
As an absentee landlord, she profited from the use of slave labour on her two Jamaican estates. It is unknown as to whether she sought to better the living and working conditions on these plantations for the 800 slaves she now jointly owned with her sister.

Atherton is unlikely to have witnessed the first hand the brutality of enslavement, however her paternal family were part of the plantocracy that were intent on delaying abolition. Her own father was an accomplished barrister, and she would have discussed and participated in intellectual conversation on commodities of the Caribbean region such as cane sugar, rum, mahogany, and passionate views in favour and against slave ownership, and possible Emancipation of the British West Indies, in front of many learned guests, as well as members of the London Society of West India Planters and Merchants. Her father never lived to witness the end of slavery since he died in 1816, but he did see the passing of 
the Slave Trade Act 1807 which abolished trading in slaves. The push to end slavery was in its infancy at the time of her birth in 1782. We do not have a personal record  of her views. As a young single woman, often surrounded by older men who thought they knew better, perhaps there was privately great shame about slavery on her own part and she considered herself helpless to make change. Thus, her own form of atonement was to contribute to, or fund worthy causes that she understood, in her somewhat narrow privileged life, surrounded only by landed gentry, the clergy and her own domestic workers.

After the abolition of slavery in the British colonies, Atherton and her sister Lucy, the wife of Richard Willis, as slave owners were entitled to claim for the compensation, by the freeing of 544 slaves from the Green Park Estate and 182 slaves from Spring Vale Estate. Jointly they received two separate compensation payments under the Slave Compensation Act 1837. £3,466 8s 8d for the loss of 182 slaves and £10,172 17s 9d for another 544 slaves.
The compensation for these Jamaican estates was split between William Harrison of London, and the father of Joseph Feilden, who was first cousin to the Richard Willis, who in turn was Atherton's late brother-in-law. Atherton  increased wealth as a result of inheritance of the cumulative  wealth of her forebears, upon the death of her younger sibling,  Lucy Willis, thereby receiving a share in the estate of her brother-in-law, Richard Willis.

Patron of the arts 
Twenty years prior to her death, Atherton and her secretary Sarah Bolger had organized the printing of a detailed catalogue of the entire John Byrom collection, which comprised 3327 books and 41 manuscripts. In addition, between 1854 and 1857 Atherton released to Chetham's Library an edited version of the Byrom manuscript shorthand diary accounts of his connection with the Jacobite rising of 1745, which included evidence of the involvement of his daughters (Atherton's female forebears), Phoebe, Beppy, and Dolly in an uprising.

Bequests upon her death
The papers of John Byrom were donated to the Chetham's Library. Her private papers were bequeathed to her secretary, Sarah Bolger, who had worked for her for more than 35 years. Bolger retired to Bournemouth where she built a house called 'Atherton' and lived very comfortably until her death in 1889.

Atherton's properties in Prescot and Walton-on-the-Hill were bequeathed to her second cousin, the Reverend James Alan Park, the son of James Alan Park and Lucy Atherton. Her two estates in Jamaica, “Green Park Estate” and “Spring Vale Pen”, together with some tenements at Prescot, and chambers in Lincoln's Inn, London, used by her father were bequeathed to the Reverends’ younger brother, Alexander Atherton Park, who was also a barrister like her own father. Atherton also left him her father's law books at the chamber.  

Some smaller estates were left to a distant cousin, Domville H.C. Poole of Lymm Hall. A final bequest was unusual in the fact that it was not to a blood relative. A large bequest went to Atherton's godson,  Edward Fox, son of Edward Vigor-Fox of the Manchester and Salford Yeomanry, who were infamously involved in the Peterloo Massacre and likely descended from Jane Vigor. Fox was directed to use the name of “Atherton Byrom”, in order to inherit her Manchester estates and land at Chester, and her cherished retreat, Kersal Cell, along with the entire Byrom Hall estate, in Lowton, which included the right to use the Byrom crest. A Royal Licence was granted by the Queen on 29 December 1870. The godson became Edward Byrom of Culver House and Kersal. He lived in Holcombe Burnell, and became High Sheriff of Devon in 1888. His sons were Edward Clement Atherton Byrom and Edward Luttrell Grimston Byrom who married Duff Twysden.

Another bequest went to merchant, Richard Atherton, residing in Philipsburg, Centre County, Pennsylvania; to be held in trust and divided between William, Francis and Isabella Atherton equally.

References

External links
 Oxford Dictionary of National Biography index entry for Eleanora Atherton

1782 births
1870 deaths
Philanthropists from Greater Manchester
English women philanthropists
British slave owners
19th-century British philanthropists
Women slave owners
19th-century women philanthropists
Jamaican planters